Uzunoba is a village in the Aghjabadi Rayon of Azerbaijan.

References 

Populated places in Aghjabadi District